Joop Eversteijn (29 January 1921 – 2 November 2013) was a Dutch footballer.

Club career
He played his entire career for ADO, primarily as a centre forward. He won the 1942 and 1943 league title with the club. He was a member of the club's board from 1965 to 1977.

Personal life
Eversteijn played several years alongside his older brother Piet, who died in March 2017, aged 97.

Death
Joop Eversteijn died on 2 November 2013, aged 92, in his hometown of The Hague, South Holland.

References

1921 births
2013 deaths
Footballers from The Hague
Association football forwards
Dutch footballers
ADO Den Haag players